Ringgold is an unincorporated community in McPherson County, Nebraska, United States.  Its elevation is 3,176 feet (968 m).  Ringgold is part of the North Platte, Nebraska Micropolitan Statistical Area.

History
A post office was operated in Ringgold for over sixty years, opening on 1 December 1906 and closing on 11 August 1967. A group of settlers from Ringold, Dawson County (an extinct town) named the community for their former home.

References

Unincorporated communities in McPherson County, Nebraska
Unincorporated communities in Nebraska
North Platte Micropolitan Statistical Area